Purchasing managers' indexes (PMI) are economic indicators derived from monthly surveys of private sector companies.

The three principal producers of PMIs are the Institute for Supply Management (ISM), which originated the manufacturing and non-manufacturing metrics produced for the United States, the Singapore Institute of Purchasing and Materials Management (SIPMM), which produces the Singapore PMI, and the S&P Global (from 2022 merger with IHS Markit), which produces metrics based on ISM's work for over 30 countries worldwide.

ISM, SIPMM, and S&P separately compile purchasing managers' index (PMI) surveys on a monthly basis by polling businesses which represent the makeup of the respective business sector. ISM's surveys cover all NAICS categories. SIPMM survey covers all manufacturing sectors. The S&P survey covers private sector companies, but not the public sector.

ISM began to produce the report for the United States in 1948. The surveys are released shortly after the end of the reference period. The actual release dates depend on the sector covered by the survey. Manufacturing data are generally released on the first business day of the month, followed by construction (S&P only) on the second working day, and non-manufacturing/services on the third business day. SIPMM produces the monthly bulletin since 1998 for the Singapore manufacturing sectors, with a focus on the electronics manufacturing sector since 1998. The data are released on the second business day of each month.

The Chicago-PMI survey, owned by Deutsche Börse, registers manufacturing and non-manufacturing activity in the Chicago Region. Investors value this indicator because the Chicago region somewhat mirrors the United States overall in its distribution of manufacturing and non-manufacturing activity. 

In 2002, SIPMM assisted China Federation of Logistics and Purchasing (CFLP) to produce the China Official PMI.

ISM, SIPMM and Markit purchasing managers indices include additional sub indices for manufacturing surveys such as new orders, employment, exports, stocks of raw materials and finished goods, prices of inputs and finished goods.

Formula, calculation, and reading
PMI data are presented in the form of a diffusion index, which is calculated as follows

where:
 P1 = Percentage number of answers that reported an improvement.
 P2 = Percentage number of answers that reported no change.
 P3 = Percentage number of answers that reported a deterioration.

Because of P1 + P2 + P3 = 100,

Thus, if 100% of the panel reported an improvement, the index would be 100.0. If 100% reported a deterioration, the index would be zero.  If 100% of the panel saw no change, the index would be 50.0 (P2 * 0.5).

Therefore, an index reading of 50.0 means that the variable is unchanged, a number over 50.0 indicates an improvement, while anything below 50.0 suggests a decline. An index of 50.0 would arise if either all respondents reported no change or the number of respondents reporting an improvement was matched by the number of respondents reporting a deterioration. The further away from 50.0 the index is, the stronger the change over the month, e.g. a reading of 55.0 points to a more frequently reported increase in a variable than a reading of 52.5. The degree of confidence experienced by respondents reporting an improvement and the degree of concern experienced by respondents reporting a deterioration are not factored into the index.

Headline Manufacturing PMI
The headline manufacturing PMI is a composite of five of the survey indices. These are New orders, Output, Employment, Suppliers' delivery times (inverted) and Stocks of purchases. The ISM attributes each of these variables the same weighting when calculating the overall PMI, whereas S&P uses the following weights: production (0.25), new orders (0.30), employment (0.20), supplier deliveries (0.15), and inventories (0.10).

S&P Economics' PMI surveys

The data for the index are collected through a survey of 400 purchasing managers in the manufacturing sector on five different fields, namely, new orders from customers, speed of supplier deliveries, inventories, order backlogs and employment level. Respondents can report either better, same or worse business conditions than previous months. For all these fields the percentage of respondents that reported better conditions than the previous months is calculated. The five percentages are multiplied by a weighting factor (the factors adding to 1) and are added.

Survey panels
Purchasing managers form a near ideal survey sample base, having access to information often denied to many other managers. Due to the nature of their job function, it is important that purchasing managers are among the first to know when trading conditions, and therefore company performance, change for the better or worse. Markit therefore uses such executives to produce data on business conditions.

In each country, a panel of purchasing managers is carefully selected by Markit, designed to accurately represent the true structure of the chosen sector of the economy as determined by official data. Generally, value added data are used at two-digit SIC level, with a further breakdown by company size analysis where possible. The survey panels therefore replicate  the actual economy in miniature. A weighting system is also incorporated into the survey database that weights each response by company size and the relative importance of the sector in which that company operates.

Particular effort is made to achieve monthly survey response rates of around 80%, ensuring that an accurate picture of business conditions is recorded over time.

Data are collected in the second half of each month via mail, email, web, fax and phone.

Questionnaires
A key feature of the PMI surveys is that they ask only for factual information. They are not surveys of opinions, intentions or expectations and the data therefore represent the closest one can get to “hard data” without asking for actual figures from companies.

Questions asked relate to key variables such as output, new orders, prices and employment. Questions take the form of up/down/same replies. For example, “Is your company’s output higher, the same or lower than one month ago?”

Respondents are asked to take expected seasonal influences into account when considering their replies.

For each main survey question, respondents are asked to provide a reason for any change on the previous month, if known. This assists not only the understanding of variable movement but also in the seasonal process when X12 cannot be used.

Seasonal adjustment
The seasonal adjustment of PMI survey data is usually calculated using the X12 statistical programme of adjustment, as used by governmental statistical bodies in many developed countries. However, the X12 programme only produces satisfactory data if five years' historical data are available. In the absence of such a history of data, the PMI survey data are seasonally adjusted using an alternative method (see next paragraph), developed by Markit Economics.

This method was initially designed to provide analysts with a guide to the underlying trend in the survey data and should be recognized as a second-best approach to X12. However, past experience in other countries suggests that Markit’s method of seasonal adjustment goes beyond this initial purpose and in fact in many cases outperforms X12 as a guide to comparable official data.

Markit's method involves using reasons cited by responding survey panel member companies for changes in variables, which are then used to ascertain whether a reported increase or decrease in each variable reflects an underlying change in economic conditions or simply a seasonal variation. Seasonal variations may include changes in demand arising from Christmas, Easter or other public holidays. Normal, expected changes in weather are not included. The net balance of companies reporting an improvement in a variable less those reporting a deterioration is then adjusted to allow for the percentages of companies reporting seasonal induced increases or decreases in the variable.

Other PMI surveys
Similar purchasing managers indices are published by the Ifo Institute for Economic Research in Germany, the Bank of Japan in Japan (Tankan), the Caixin China PMI published by Markit and the Swedish PMI run by private bank Swedbank.

The Singapore PMI (新加坡采购经理指数) is published by Singapore Institute of Purchasing and Materials Management on a monthly basis. It was developed by Professor Philip Poh. He has also contributed to the development of the Chinese PMI, and the Euro PMI.

The PRIX index uses a diffusion index methodology based on that of PMIs. However, rather than drawing on purchasing managers, it uses country analysts based in the world's 20 largest oil exporting countries to forecast political events that may affect global oil exports. The PRIX index is updated quarterly and published for free on the internet.

See also
 Ivey Index

References

Procurement
Business indices
Surveys (human research)